Kirstin Freye-Menzler (born 29 May 1975 in Herford) is a former German professional tennis player. 

She took part in the 2002 Al Habtoor Tennis Challenge and was the champion in doubles. Freye-Menzler has never won a singles event but she has won 22 doubles titles on the ITF circuit. In addition, she played doubles on the WTA Tour, reaching the last 16 of the 2003 Australian Open (her best result at a Grand Slam), and the semifinals in Quebec City in 2002 (her best result on the WTA Tour).

ITF finals

Singles (0–3)

Doubles (22–19)

External links
 
 

1975 births
Living people
German female tennis players
Tennis people from North Rhine-Westphalia